Regina Aparecida "Queen" Saraiva (born September 1, 1968, Sorocaba, São Paulo, Brazil), also known as Regina,  Queen Regina, or Jean Jane, is a Brazilian-born Italian eurodance vocalist, dancer and actress who scored several hits across Europe from 1997 to 2003. She lives in Milan, Italy, where she is a part of the gospel choir that is featured on Piero Chiambretti’s program Markette which broadcasts by La7 as well as performing new material. She was also a member of the Brazilian dance act Forbidden Fruit from 1989 to 1995. "Day by Day" was her only big hit in the United States, peaking at #11 on Billboard Magazine's Hot Dance Music/Club Play chart in 1997.

Discography

Singles 
"You Got Me Now" (as F.M. presents Jean Jane) (1994)
"Take Me Up" (as Jean Jane) (1994)
"Party Town" (as Jean Jane) (1994)
"Killing Me Softly" (1996)
"Day by Day" (1997)
"Stranger in Paradise" (With Xpone, billed as "Queen Regina") (1997)
"Close the door"
 What Can You Do (1998)
"You and Me" (2000)
"You Don't Fool Me" (2001)
"Secret Mission" (2000)
"I'm Back" (2002)
"Up / You and I" (2007)
"Time Shine" (Feat Musta y Capasso) (2011)
"Imaginaçao" (2013)
"The Girl From Ipanema" (2014)
"Ibiza Vibe" (2016)

Note: Billboard incorrectly lists "Day By Day" as a 1997 hit for American singer Regina, who had retired from recording at the time.

Album 
Situations (1998)

External links
Regina's Facebook page
First unofficial Regina website (Italian) 
Regina's MySpace page
Regina's profile at La7 (Italian)
Regina's videos at Do It Yourself records' website
Profile of Regina (In English)
Article from 2000 Windsurf Music Festival (In English)

1968 births
Brazilian dance musicians
English-language singers from Brazil
Brazilian television actresses
Living people